Have a Nice Day (previously titled 好极了 (Hǎojíle)) is a 2017 Chinese animated dark comedy film directed by Liu Jian. It premiered in the main competition for the Golden Bear at the 67th Berlin International Film Festival in February 2017. It is Liu Jian's second feature film, following his debut Piercing I. The film, mostly done by Liu himself, took three years to complete.

Its plot revolves around the journey of Xiao Zhang, a young driver working for a gang, who steals a bag from his boss containing a million yuan (approximately US$150,000) to fund a trip to South Korea for his girlfriend to save her failed plastic surgery in Nanjing, Jiangsu.

The film was withdrawn from the Annecy International Animated Film Festival in June 2017 at its producer's demand as it did not have proper governmental clearance to be screened internationally.

Strand Releasing distributed the film in US while Memento Films International handled additional territories including the UK, Mexico, Spain, Benelux, Switzerland, Greece, Turkey and Eastern Europe. The film has been licensed to screen in more than 30 countries. In China, the premiere of the film took place at the Pingyao International Film Festival in early November 2017, with a guest appearance by Chinese film director Jia Zhangke, who praised the film as a milestone in Chinese animation.

The film won Best Animation Feature at the 54th Golden Horse Awards.

Cast
 Zhu Changlong as Xiao Zhang, the driver
 Cao Kai as Lao Zhao
 Liu Jian as Fang Yuanjun
 Yang Siming as Uncle Liu
 Shi Haitao as A De
 Ma Xiaofeng as Shou Pi
 Xue Feng as Lao San
 Zheng Yi as Er Jie
 Cao Kou as Huang Yan
 Zhu Hong as Gu Anan

References

External links
 

2017 black comedy films
2017 animated films
2017 films
2010s crime comedy films
Animated comedy films
Chinese animated films
Chinese black comedy films
Chinese crime comedy films
Films about organized crime
Films set in 2016 
2010s Mandarin-language films